The Rugby Club Savoie Rumilly (formally known as Football Club Sportif Rumilly) is a French rugby union club based in Rumilly in Haute-Savoie department. It's playing en Fédérale 1., the third level of French Rugby,

The club played in the first division of French Rugby (Première division), between 1986 and 1997. In 1995, the FCSR was the 11th best club of France.

History 
In 1906, the soldier of an alpine battalion begun to play with other young men of the city.
In October 1908, Constant Verlioz wrote an article in the Journal du commerce, (nowadays Hebdo des Savoie), proposing the foundation of a sporting club that was established on July 16, 1911 with the name of "Union Sportive Rumillienne".

Constant Berlioz was named president and the member of senate, Jean Clerc named secretary.

M. Bouchardy was appointed as treasury responsible.

The first training was made in September 17, and the first match in October 15 against FC Aix le Bains on the ground of  Pérouses

The club was closed in 1913.

In 1928 another club was founded by two brothers,  Jean and Georges Berogoin with the technical help of the captain Luois Tempoin.

The first general assembly mas made on December 20, 1929.

In 1930–1931, the Rumilly was Finalist of "Championnat des Alpes", 4th division.
In 1935, the Rumilly was finalist of the third division of same championship, and in 1938 was also finalist of  second division.

In 1939, the activity was suspended for the war. In 1950, the club was newly launched by Fernand Galban that built and equipped for young players in 1950.

In 1954, the Rumilly return to play in a championship, in the national fourth division.

In 1955, the first team, was the champions of Alps and semifinalist at national level.

In 1956 the team won the Alps Championship of third division and play the national semifinals.

In 1957, was opened the "Stade des Grangettes" and the club was gain the Alps Champion.

In 1958, finally the club, winning the championship was promoted in the second division ("Championnat de  Honneur" )

In 1959, finally the promotion at the federal championship (third level)

In 1981, the Rumilly junior team was semifinalist in national championship

In 1983, the Rumilly was the French Champion of  third federal division, and in 1986 of second division.

In 1988 was the French Champion of "Group B" of first division. Finally in 1990, the club played for the first time in the highest championship.

The club remain for six years at highest level.  In 1994-1995, the Rumilly was the 11th club of France, in the first edition of "top 16".

The club was relegated in second division after the 1995-96 championship.

During the start of professional era, the best results will be the semifinals played in the ProD2 championship of 2000–2001.

The decline restart soon and in the 2003 the club was relegated in Fédérale 1. After two championship when the clun will play the "last 16" round, in 2004-05 it was relegated again for a year in Fédérale 2, coming back soon of higher level.

In 2006-07 the club was initially relegated, but remained at the end in Fédérale 1, due to financial  problems of some other clubs.

But in 2007-08 the club was again relegated, losing 6 match on six in the "relegation round".

In 2011–2012, the club remain unbeaten on his ground, but was defeat in the "last 32 round"

In January 2018 the club voted to change their name to Rugby Club Savoie Rumilly.

Palmares

Seniors

 Championnat of France (Top 16)
 Two times in Last 16 1991-92, 1994-95
 French championship of "groupe B: 
 Champion (1) : 1988
Vice-Champion (1) :1991
 ProD2 
 Semifinalist : 1998-99 and 2000-01
 Fédérale 2  : 
 Champion : 1986
Fédérale 3  : 
 Champion : 1983
Coupe André Moga
 Winner  : 1993
 Pidmont-Savoie-Geneve Trophy 
 Winner : 2011-2011
 Alps Championship :
 Winner (5) : 1955, 195, 1957. 1976, 1977 
 Vice-champion (3) : 1930-1935-1938
 Challenge of l'Amitié :
 Winner (1) : 1986
 Tournois of Sixte :
 Winner (2) : 1946, 1947

History

Notable former players

Vern Cotter
Franck Comba
Mickaël Forest
Franck Hueber
Christian Bel

See also
 List of rugby union clubs in France

References

External links
Official website

Rumilly
Rumilly
1928 establishments in France
Sport in Haute-Savoie